Secret Pakistan is a two-part documentary by the BBC, first aired on 26 October 2011. It included claims by mid-ranking Taliban commanders that they had been taught bomb-making by Pakistan's Inter-Services Intelligence (ISI), and suggestions that the ISI had tipped off high-ranking al-Qaeda figures about imminent American attacks. The series generated controversy after Pakistan blocked BBC World News claiming it contained "anti-Pakistan" content and that the program was one sided.

Reception
It received an audience of 1 million (4.1%) at 9pm.

The British newspaper The Independent called it "intriguing and depressing," although the reviewer felt the program should have focused more on the trustworthiness of American intentions towards Pakistan.

References

External links
 
 

BBC television documentaries
Anti-Pakistan sentiment
Film censorship in Pakistan
Documentary films about Pakistan
2011 in British television
Taliban
Government of Pakistan secrecy
Censored films